Melanoxanthus yushiroi is a species of beetle from the Elateridae family. The scientific name of this species was first published in 1999 by W. Suzuki.

References

Elateridae
Beetles described in 1999